The Union of Communist Youth Marxist-Leninist (abbreviated UJC(ml)) was a French maoist youth organization. UJC(ml) was founded on December 10, 1966, by youth activists excluded from the Union of Communist Students. On 12 June 1968, UJC(ml) was banned under a decree signed by then President of France Charles de Gaulle in response to the May Events of that year. Some members of UJC(ml) founded new political movement -  Gauche prolétarienne

References

Bibliography
 Christophe Bourseiller, Les maoïstes. La folle histoire des gardes rouges français, Éditions du Seuil, collection « Points – essais », 2008.
 Hervé Hamon et Patrick Rotman, Génération, 1. Les années de rêve ; 2. Les années de plomb, Éditions du Seuil, 1988.
 Patrick Kessel, Le Mouvement « maoïste » en France, UGE – 10/18 ; 2 tomes : 1972 et 1978.

External links 
 History and documents of the UJC(ml)

Maoist organizations in France
Youth wings of communist parties
Youth wings of political parties in France
Student wings of communist parties
Student wings of political parties in France
Student organizations established in 1966